Yunosheskoye is a rural locality (a selo) in Rostilovskoye Rural Settlement, Gryazovetsky District, Vologda Oblast, Russia. The population was 26 as of 2002.

Geography 
Yunosheskoye is located 16 km southeast of Gryazovets (the district's administrative centre) by road. Yermolino is the nearest rural locality.

References 

Rural localities in Gryazovetsky District